Diplomat Records is an American hip hop record label co-founded by Harlem rappers Jim Jones and Cam'ron.

History 
In the early 2000s, Dipset was very popular for having star rappers with radio hits like Juelz Santana and Cam'ron, as well as their association with Jay-Z and Damon Dash's Roc-A-Fella Records, which was distributed under Def Jam Recordings. This resulted in four studio albums being released under the Dipset/Roc-A-Fella joint venture. In 2005, Dipset moved away from Roc-A-Fella after Jay-Z assumed presidency of Def Jam, which they took issue with. They had already signed to independent music powerhouse MNRK Music Group (formerly Koch/eOne) the year prior. Despite this, Juelz Santana's remained under contract with Def Jam for the time being until 2008 when Cam'ron sold his contract to the label in 2008. Santana only released one album under his Dipset/Def Jam deal in late 2005. Even though the Diplomats/Koch partnership seemed financially improved over the Roc-A-Fella deal, only co-founder Jim Jones became the most successful Dipset artist under that deal; one notice was his single, "We Fly High" (2006) scoring among the Billboard top ten and going platinum the following year. Between 2006 and 2009, Dipset was relatively quiet aside from Cam'ron and Jim Jones after alleged falling outs. However, in 2010, they reunited and have begun to associate themselves with rapper Vado. The recent release under Diplomat Records was in 2018 with the Empire-distributed Diplomatic Ties.

Distribution
Diplomat Records doesn't have traditional distribution in the sense that each of its artists have deals with individual labels. In 2005, after signing with Koch (now MNRK Music) in 2004, then-president of A&R George "Duke Da God" Moore signed a deal to release the first official compilation through Dipset/Koch, Dipset: More Than Music, Vol. 1.  Also in 2005, when co-founder Cam'ron parted ways with Roc-A-Fella/Def Jam and signed with Warner Music Group's Alternative Distribution Alliance-distributed Asylum Records, he secured that his albums to be released under Diplomat Records, while also securing any future Diplomat group albums under Koch, with the exclusion of Juelz Santana, due to his obligations with Def Jam. Former president Freekey Zekey also released his debut album on Diplomat with distribution coming from Koch. In addition to the deal with Koch to release the More Than Music, Vol. 1 compilation album, co-founder Jim Jones released his first three albums under Koch in association with Diplomat Records.  Juelz Santana also released his first two albums under Diplomat with distribution by Def Jam (one of which was his debut release under Def Jam's Roc-A-Fella), until his contract as a solo artist with Diplomat was sold to Def Jam by Cam'ron in 2008. In a 2008 interview, Diplomat member and signee 40 Cal. confirmed several labels that the individual members at the time (including J.R. Writer) were being distributed under Babygrande, though earlier reports listed him as being distributed, like many others on the Diplomat label, through Koch.

Roster

Current

Former

Discography

References

External links
Official website

The Diplomats
American record labels
Vanity record labels
American hip hop record labels
Record labels established in 2001
Gangsta rap record labels
Hardcore hip hop record labels